Minuscule 246 (in the Gregory-Aland numbering), ε 460 (Soden), is a Greek minuscule manuscript of the New Testament, on paper. Palaeographically it has been assigned to the 14th century.

Description 

The codex contains a complete text of the four Gospels on 189 paper leaves (size ), with two lacunae (Matthew 12:41-13:55; John 17:24-18:20). The text is written in one column per page, 26 lines per page.

Synaxarion and Menologion were added by a later hand.

Text 

The Greek text of the codex is a representative of the Byzantine text-type. Hermann von Soden classified it to the textual family Kr. Aland placed it in Category V.

According to the Claremont Profile Method it belongs to the textual family Kr in Luke 1 and Luke 20 as a perfect member. In Luke 10 no profile was made.

History 

Formerly the manuscript was held at Athos peninsula. It was brought to Moscow, by the monk Arsenius, on the suggestion of the Patriarch Nikon, in the reign of Alexei Mikhailovich Romanov (1645-1676). The manuscript was collated by C. F. Matthaei.

The manuscript is currently housed at the State Historical Museum (V. 19, S. 274) at Moscow.

See also 

 List of New Testament minuscules
 Biblical manuscript
 Textual criticism

References

Further reading 

 C. F. Matthaei, Novum Testamentum Graece et Latine, (Riga, 1782-1788). (as p)
 C. F. Matthaei, D. Pavli Epistolae ad Thessalonicenses et Ad Timotheum Graece et Latine (1782-1785), p. 263.
 Kurt Treu, Die Griechischen Handschriften des Neuen Testaments in der UdSSR; eine systematische Auswertung des Texthandschriften in Leningrad, Moskau, Kiev, Odessa, Tbilisi und Erevan, T & U 90 (Berlin, 1966), pp. 249–251.

Greek New Testament minuscules
14th-century biblical manuscripts